The Commission on Proceedings Involving Guy Paul Morin—known as the Kaufman Commission or the Morin Inquiry—was a 1996 royal commission appointed by the Government of Ontario to address the wrongful conviction in 1992 of Guy Paul Morin for the murder of Christine Jessop on 3 October 1984, for which he was exonerated by DNA evidence on 23 January 1995.

The public inquiry was issued on 26 June 1996 by the Lieutenant Governor-in-Council, appointing Fred Kaufman, Q.C., a former judge of the Quebec Court of Appeal, as commissioner. The hearings began on 10 February 1997 and continued for 146 days. Kaufman's report—commonly known as the Kaufman Report—was released on 9 April 1998 and contained 119 recommendations.

Morin's conviction has been cited as one of Canada's most famous wrongful conviction cases. The inquiry led to significant alterations of how police investigated murders in Canada. Lawyer Bruce MacFarlane said that the report "is arguably the most comprehensive judicial review that has ever been undertaken into the causes of wrongful conviction, and how to avoid them."

The real killer remained unidentified until 2020. On 15 October 2020, Toronto Police identified Jessop’s murderer as Calvin Hoover, a friend and neighbour of the Jessop family who was 28 at the time of the case; he had died in 2015.

History

Death of Christine Jessop 

Christine Marion Jessop (29 November 1974 –  3 October 1984) was a 9-year-old Canadian girl from Queensville, Ontario, who was abducted, raped, and murdered in October 1984.

Jessop's mother and elder brother, Kenney, had travelled to a detention centre where her father Bob was in custody.

Jessop was declared missing on 3 October 1984.

Conviction and appeal 
Police turned their attention to Jessop's next-door neighbour, Guy Paul Morin, on 14 February 1985, after he was mentioned by Jessop's mother.

Police set up surveillance of the Morin home on 19 February, with two officers eventually interviewing him three days later, on 22 February. The following year, on 22 April 1985, Morin was arrested. He was twice put on trial for first-degree murder; the first trial began on 7 January 1986, for which he was acquitted. However, on 4 March, the Attorney General of Ontario launched an appeal of Morin's acquittal. The Crown claimed that the trial judge had made a mistake in directing the jury about the meaning of "reasonable doubt" and that the acquittal should thus be thrown out and Morin retried. The Court of Appeal agreed, and on 5 June 1987, it ordered a new trial. Morin appealed this decision to the Supreme Court of Canada, who dismissed the appeal on 17 November 1988.

This second trial began on 28 May 1990, and Morin was convicted of first-degree murder on 30 July 1992.

Immediately after Morin's conviction, a grassroots organization called Justice for Guy Paul Morin Committee was established to aid him in his search for exoneration. The Committee's first objective was to help Morin to appeal his conviction and in the meantime, to apply for his release on bail while he waited for the appeal to be decided. Morin was granted bail on 9 February 1993. Following this decision, the Committee reorganized itself as the Association in Defence of the Wrongly Convicted (AIDWYC), now Innocence Canada, having decided to broaden its mandate from defending Morin to working on behalf of all wrongly convicted Canadians.

It was not until 23 January 1995, almost 10 years after he was first arrested, that Morin was exonerated as a result of DNA testing that had not previously been available. In February 1995, the Ontario Attorney General's office transferred the case from the Durham Regional Police to the Toronto Police. However, after interviewing over 300 suspects, a special, 9-man task force disbanded in March.

The real killer remained unidentified until 2020, when his DNA was linked to the crime scene using genetic genealogy.

The Commission and Report 
On 26 June 1996, the Lieutenant Governor-in-Council issued the "Commission on Proceedings Involving Guy Paul Morin" to inquire into the issue, appointing Fred Kaufman, Q.C., a former judge of the Quebec Court of Appeal, as commissioner. The Commission was officially mandated to "inquire into the conduct of the investigation into the death of Christine Jessop, the conduct of the Centre for Forensic Sciences in relation to the maintenance, security and preservation of forensic evidence, and into the criminal proceedings involving the charge that Guy Paul Morin murdered Christine Jessop."

The hearings began on 10 February 1997 and continued for 146 days, calling 120 witnesses and combing through over 100,000 pages of documents. Twenty-five parties were given standing and numerous witnesses were called to testify who were either experts or participants in the administration of criminal justice from around the world.

Kaufman gave an oral ruling on 22 October 1997. His subsequently report was released in 2 volumes on 9 April 1998, containing 1,380 pages and made 119 recommendations.

Recommendations 
Kaufman said that he believed no Crown Counsel or police officer "ever intended to convict an innocent person." Rather, he said, they developed a "staggering" tunnel vision regarding their belief in Morin's guilt that led to a lack of objectivity and serious errors in judgment. The report defines tunnel vision as a "single-minded and overly narrow focus on a particular investigative or prosecutorial theory, so as to unreasonably colour the evaluation of information received." In the conclusion to his Report, Kaufman commented that, "An innocent person was convicted of a heinous crime he did not commit. Science helped convict him. Science exonerated him."

As such, many of Kaufman's 119 recommendations were systemic in nature, dealing with ways in which police and prosecutors can avoid a narrow mind set—ranging from better interviewing techniques and improved methods of gathering and storing evidence from a crime scene, to continuing education of officers.

Real murderer 

Jessop's real murderer remained unidentified until 15 October 2020, when Toronto Police named the killer as Calvin Hoover, who was 28 at the time of the case.

Hoover's DNA was linked to the crime scene using genetic genealogy. In 2015, he took his own life in Port Hope, Ontario. Following an autopsy, a sample of his blood was on file at the Centre of Forensic Sciences laboratory in Toronto, which is what detectives used to conclusively match his DNA to the Jessop crime scene.

Hoover was apparently a friend of the Jessop family; in fact, the 9-year-old girl visited Hoover and his family at their home in the days prior to her going missing. Hoover even helped search for her when she disappeared.

Hoover's wife was interviewed by York Regional Police the day following Jessop's disappearance. While Calvin Hoover's name was mentioned more than once in the homicide case file—including when his wife told investigators that he was taking care of their kids and had nothing to add to her statement—he was never actually questioned. Police have since confirmed that Hoover was never questioned, but the oversight has never been explained.

References

Further reading

 Faryon, Cynthia J. 2013. Guilty of Being Weird: The Story of Guy Paul Morin. ISBN 978-1-4594-0094-8.

External links
Kaufman Report

Commissions and inquiries in Ontario
Legal history of Canada
Murder in Ontario